John Hendrix Baker, III (born March 15, 1941) is a former American football linebacker and tight end.  He played college football at Mississippi State University, where he was a linebacker and an offensive end.  He played professionally in the American Football League (AFL) for the Houston Oilers from 1963 through 1966 and for the San Diego Chargers in 1967.

Personal life
Baker married Carla Swanson, a member of the Swanson TV dinners family, on June 22, 1968, at Kountze Memorial Lutheran Church in Omaha, Nebraska.  He has a daughter named Cara and three sons : Jason, Jacob, and Joshua.  Joshua pitched in the College World Series for the Rice Owls.  Baker is the father-in-law of Major League Baseball player Lance Berkman.

See also
 List of American Football League players

References

1941 births
Living people
People from Camden, Alabama
Players of American football from Alabama
American football linebackers
American football tight ends
Mississippi State Bulldogs football players
Houston Oilers players
San Diego Chargers players
American Football League players